Louis Thomas Black (June 8, 1901 – November 18, 1965) was one of the foremost banjo players of the Jazz Era.

Born in Rock Island, Illinois, he began playing banjo during early childhood and became professional in 1917.

In 1921, he joined the famous New Orleans Rhythm Kings at Friar's Inn in Chicago.  With this band, he participated to the first-ever interracial recording session with pianist Jelly Roll Morton.

He left the band in 1923 to play with other bands.  From 1925 until 1931, he was a staff musician for radio station WHO in Des Moines, Iowa.

He left music in early 1930s, but began playing again in 1961.  He sat in with several bands during a brief stay in New York City, then played gigs in Moline, Illinois from the fall of 1963.

While recovering in a Rock Island hospital from injuries sustained in an automobile accident, he suffered a fatal heart attack.

Further reading
Eugene Chadbourne, [ Lou Black] at Allmusic

American banjoists
People from Rock Island, Illinois
1901 births
1965 deaths
20th-century American musicians
New Orleans Rhythm Kings members